"True" is a song by English new wave band Spandau Ballet, released in April 1983 as the title track and third single from their third studio album. It was written by the band's guitarist/songwriter Gary Kemp to express his feelings for Altered Images lead singer Clare Grogan, influenced musically by songs of Marvin Gaye and Al Green he was listening to at the time, and lyrically by Green and The Beatles. It eventually reached number one on the UK chart in April 1983 and made the top 10 in several other countries, including the US, where it became their first song to reach the Billboard Hot 100.

Kemp wanted to shift the sound of Spandau Ballet into soul and incorporated band member Steve Norman's newfound interest in the saxophone into his writing; the band also updated its look to suits for the song's music video and tour. "True" was recorded with most of the other tracks from the album at Compass Point Studios in the Bahamas. The True album was then released as "Communication", its first single, was climbing the UK Singles Chart. DJs were so enthusiastic about playing the title song that the band knew it would be their next single.

The song has since become the band's signature hit. It has been covered by Paul Anka in a swing style, and used in films such as Sixteen Candles and 50 First Dates, as well as TV series like Modern Family. Other artists have sampled it in their own hits, most notably P.M. Dawn, who went to number one in the US with "Set Adrift on Memory Bliss" in 1991.

Background and writing

In 1981, Spandau Ballet guitarist/songwriter Gary Kemp met Altered Images lead singer Clare Grogan and felt an "instant connection" in part due to their conversations about writers. For his birthday that year, she gave him a copy of the novel Lolita by Vladimir Nabokov, whom they had discussed. He intended the relationship to be platonic since he already had a girlfriend, but he was also competing for her attention with two other men: actor John Gordon Sinclair, who starred with her in Gregory's Girl, and artist David Band, who had designed cover art for Altered Images; he would later do so for Spandau Ballet with the single "Communication".

Spandau Ballet's first album, Journeys to Glory, was released in 1981. It reflected their desire to represent the clientele of the trendy London nightclub the Blitz with its focus on what Kemp called "white European disco music". Their second album, Diamond, had a successful stab at funk with its lead single, "Chant No. 1 (I Don't Need This Pressure On)", but otherwise disappointed critics with its more experimental material. The poor chart performance of its next two singles, "Paint Me Down" and "She Loved Like Diamond", resulted in a remix of its more pop-sounding track "Instinction", which became a number 10 hit on the UK Singles Chart in spring 1982. That rebound brought a stark realisation for Kemp: the nightclub crowd Spandau Ballet originally catered to was no longer interested in them. He told John Wilson in a Mastertapes interview in 2013 that, because they were unable keep the audience they initially attracted, "[t]here was a sense of, '[w]e have to move on from here,'" a desire to expand to a broader audience. This later inspired the "True" lyric "I bought a ticket to the world". allowing him to focus more on the melody. He told Creem magazine in 1984, "For the first time, I was trying to write songs that were emotional release for me—me just writing about myself and the way I felt."

Kemp was primarily listening to soul artists Marvin Gaye and Al Green as he developed songs for the band's next album. His love of their music factored heavily into writing the title track, even to the point of paying tribute to Gaye on a first-name basis:

He wanted to write a blue-eyed soul version of what Gaye and Green performed, something "with that kind of vulnerability and atmosphere of uncertainty", with music like Green's "Let's Stay Together" and lyrics from his own experience, particularly with regard to his feelings for Grogan. Kemp began the music for what became "True" in mid-1982 after watching the 1970 Beatles documentary Let It Be on television; afterwards the song "Dig a Pony" stuck in his head. In a 2017 interview with The Wall Street Journal, he described how the song opens: "John Lennon sings 'I, hi-hi, hi-hi, I dig a pony.' I loved how he took that one word—'I'—and turned it into a snaking melody." Kemp took to his Eko acoustic guitar that evening wanting to avoid the dance rhythms he was used to writing and instead structured a melody around the word "I" the way Lennon had. He reworked the opening line from Green's hit, "I'm, I'm so in love with you", as "Ah ha-hah hahh-hi / I know this / much is / true-oo." 

"'True' is about how difficult it is to be honest when you're trying to write a love song to someone", Kemp later admitted. "Hence: 'Why do I find it hard to write the next line?'" In his 2009 autobiography I Know This Much: From Soho to Spandau, he explained that even conveying his feelings in lyrics he "felt inhibited, shy even, so I started to write about that very thing: the fear of revealing oneself, of saying in song what was true." Of the infatuation that he was uncomfortable confessing, he later told The Daily Telegraph, "I didn't want to write it down—because there's nothing more embarrassing." After reworking Green's opening line, he decided the song would not focus so much upon what he knew was true regarding the subject as it would on the issue of how much of the truth he was going to tell. He wanted to use the song as a way to tell Grogan how he felt by choosing phrases no one else would understand and looked through the copy of Lolita she had given him. He found the underlined phrases "pill on my tongue" and "seaside limbs", the latter of which he modified for the lyric "Take your seaside arms and write the next line / Oh, I want the truth to be known." Parsing the other selection, he thought, "'A pill dissolves, doesn't it? And the pill was trying to dissolve the nerves that I have, because I'm nervous when I'm with you or thinking about you'". He wrote the lyric "With a thrill in my head and a pill on my tongue / Dissolve the nerves that have just begun." After he had finished writing the song, he felt it was more about the process of creating something "with a blue-eyed soul feel" than it was about Grogan. 

Spandau Ballet had already released two albums and several singles, but Kemp and his brother, Martin, the band's bassist, were still living with their parents. Once finished with "True", Kemp sang and played it on his guitar for Martin, who liked it and thought it was ready to record. When Gary performed it for the rest of the band, he was accompanied by an old friend from his years at Dame Alice Owen's School, pianist Jess Bailey. Kemp had discovered a Rhodes Chroma keyboard that gave him the sound he wanted, and Bailey adapted Gary's guitar chords so that he could play more than just single notes on the new polyphonic synthesiser.

Kemp wrote in his autobiography that "by far the slickest musician in the band" was Steve Norman, who had played guitar on Journeys to Glory but switched to percussion instruments on Diamond. They enlisted the help of Beggar & Co as the horn section on that album for tracks such as "Chant No. 1", which inspired Norman to take up the saxophone. Kemp called it "another voice within the band" and that he "would purposely write to elevate his saxophone into its own space" by changing keys, "and that just steps it out of the track and puts it somewhere else." Kemp wrote "True" in the key of G major with a tempo of 98 BPM and a chord progression of G, Em9, CMaj9, Bm7. The song modulates to the key of E♭ major for the sax solo, after which it returns to G Major. Norman told The Guardian in 2012 that his solo combined two takes; at the time the band began working on "True" he had been regularly listening to the Grover Washington Jr.–Bill Withers hit "Just the Two of Us", explaining, "The solo is a reply to that: at the key change things just lift off, giving the song a moment of elation." The interest in the saxophone went beyond "True" for Kemp, who recalled how, as teenagers, he and Norman had appreciated its use on hits by Smokey Robinson and Stevie Wonder and, specifically, on Evelyn "Champagne" King's  "Shame". He thought the instrument epitomized soul music and should be prominently featured on the new album.

Recording
The band wanted to record at Compass Point Studios in the Bahamas because of the soul music that had been recorded there; Kemp also felt that the tropical surroundings would help give the music the feeling he was trying to achieve. They also decided to get assistance in producing what would be True from Tony Swain and Steve Jolley, who had recently worked with Bananarama and Imagination. The band appreciated the use of the synth-bass on the latter's hit single "Body Talk" so much that they had Swain play the instrument on the recording of "True" instead of having Martin Kemp play electric bass. In describing how the change lent itself to the new sound they were after, Kemp insisted, "Martin didn't mind. We all loved the synth bass's sound. It was of its time and had a disco, funk-soul feel. We were trying to rebrand ourselves in a slightly different direction."

The backing vocals for the song were recorded using a Dolby noise-reduction system, but the band decided not to use the decoder that would remove the hissing from the recording because they liked the sound of the "airy, breathy fizz on top". The result gave Kemp a sense of the success they would be enjoying: "When we listened to the playback in the studio, everyone suddenly started singing along, the road crew and everything. I think we knew then it was a number 1." 

Hadley's lead vocal was recorded with Steve Jolley producing at Red Bus Studios in Paddington after returning from Nassau. In his 2004 autobiography To Cut a Long Story Short, Hadley wrote, "It's quite a complicated song to sing in terms of phrasing and timing, and we soldiered on for ages before we felt we'd got it right." When asked in a 2017 Professor of Rock interview about the high note he reaches while singing, "Oh, I want the truth to be said," at the point between the sax solo and the final chorus, he responded, "I don't do that big note at the end now. I just play it down." The plan was to open the song with just a string synthesizer, but Swain was unhappy with how it sounded and came up with the idea of using the chorus for the beginning without the lead. Kemp attributed the album version's six-and-a-half-minute length to their love for the finished product with the lead vocal finally included.

Cover art 
Kemp asked Band to work with Spandau Ballet on the design for the new album. Because they were both seeing their careers take off during their attempts to court Grogan, they went camping together a few times in the English Lake District as a way of escaping their success. Kemp recalled, "We first started to devise a cover together for the True album when we were up in the mountains, in one of the pubs one evening. He was drawing in his sketchbook and a dove appeared, this little dove." Band later added alongside it the outline of a man's head with a brimmed hat, which the band loved; a variation was used for the sleeve of the "True" single. His work was described as "a marker for the look of the time, a jazz-influenced style that could also be seen in an exaggerated fashion in the New Romantic look." Kemp credits him with having "the skill of coming up with simple, figurative graphics that would set a visual tone for the decade." In 2012 he told The Herald:
 

Kemp was unaware of some of the fun poked at the song: "Our friendly in-house press girl, Julia Marcus, even told us that she and a friend had boldly graffitied the toilet at Camden Palace with the Spandau dove and the word True." In his autobiography Pop Stars in My Pantry: A Memoir of Pop Mags and Clubbing in the 1980s, her friend, music journalist Paul Simper, recounted that the text written under the dove actually read, "This Much Is Poo".

Release and commercial performance
When the True album was completed, the band's label, Chrysalis Records, was pleased with the results and felt it would succeed on the strength of "Gold" and the title song. The first single, "Lifeline", had been recorded at Red Bus in August 1982 and released on 24 September. It peaked at number 7 on the UK Singles Chart and made its last appearance there at the end of November. The album was completed the following month, but Kemp explained that when the next single needed to be chosen, the band's manager, Steve Dagger, "didn't want to go with a ballad next and recommended another up-tempo first. 'Communication' got the band vote. Why we didn’t go straight for 'True' or 'Gold' as the next single, I'm not sure. Maybe we felt their success would be automatic and wanted to save them for later, during the album's release." It was released in early February 1983, with the album following in the UK a month later, debuting on the UK Albums Chart on 12 March, the same week "Communication" peaked at number 12. Kemp felt the success of "Communication" was hampered by the fact that "radio DJs were all playing the album track 'True' instead". Hadley recalled one instance in which Simon Bates of BBC Radio 1, having just played the album version of "True" on the air before it became a single and predicting to his listeners that it would go to number one when it did, played it again immediately. For Kemp, the decision had been made for them: "By public demand, 'True' would be our next single."

Norman thought the band had a "friendly rivalry" with Duran Duran: "In the studio, we used to leave each other insulting messages, jokes and caricatures." After "True" was released in mid-April 1983, however, they left Spandau Ballet a message to let them know that they thought the song was "fantastic". Despite Kemp's feeling in the Bahamas that it would be a hit, Hadley never even thought it would be released as a single. In 2014, he revealed that he did not think it was their best song—he preferred 1986's "Through the Barricades"—and that he was still confused by lyrics such as "Head over heels when toe to toe", concluding "But then, I suppose, we grew up on David Bowie and Roxy Music. 'Virginia Plain'—what's that about? Half of the Bowie songs, I couldn't tell you what they're about. With 'True', you have to create the imagery for yourself." In his autobiography, regarding his initial skepticism, he admitted, "No one was more surprised than me when it went on to become our biggest hit."

The day before Spandau Ballet learned that "True" had reached number one on the UK Singles Chart at the end of April, they had heard that the single had sold over 60,000 copies in one day and that their closest competitors had only sold one-third of that. They were on tour in Sheffield when Dagger heard the announcement of their chart feat, so he called their hotel to give them the news. Kemp spoke to him, excitedly woke drummer John Keeble with whom he shared the hotel room to spread the news, and snuck into Hadley's room to spray him awake with champagne. Remembering Keeble riding a room-service trolley down the hotel corridor in celebration, Hadley conceded that they "were all in high spirits" but that the rambunctious activities seemed "slightly flat" in light of their recent success. His surprise over selecting the song as a single had given way to certainty that it would top the charts, "It had such momentum the overwhelming feeling was, how can this not be a number 1?"

Once "True" had finished its third week as the most popular song in the UK, another goal came into view: the British music chart television programme Top of the Pops would be celebrating its thousandth episode the following week, so a fourth week at number one would mean that their performance of "True" would close out the milestone show. The success of "(Keep Feeling) Fascination" by the Human League seemed like it might prevent that from happening

Dagger met with Danny Glass, the head of radio promotion at Chrysalis New York, to discuss distributing the song to stations in the US, and Glass proposed starting with those focused on the Black market so that the fact that the band were all white would initially go unnoticed and not deter the potential audience there. Adult contemporary and pop stations would be next on the list. The first chart the song appeared on in Billboard magazine, however, was the Hot 100, the US equivalent of the UK Singles Chart. "True" debuted there at the beginning of August and peaked at number 4 during its 18 weeks there. Later in the month it debuted on the magazine's Adult Contemporary chart, where it spent 22 weeks, one of them at number 1. Its eight-week run on the magazine's list of the most popular Black Singles in the US began at the end of the month and included a peak position of 76, and the mid-October edition marked the start of four weeks on the Top Tracks rock chart, where it reached number 34.
In addition to its 4 weeks at number 1 on the UK Singles Chart "True" also reached the top spot on the pop charts in Canada and Ireland and made the top 10 in several other countries. It received Gold certification from the British Phonographic Industry in May 1983 for shipping a half-million units and came in at number 6 on the list of the UK's best-selling songs that year. In 2011, it received a BMI award as one of the most played songs in US history with 4 million airplays. It received Platinum certification from BPI for 600,000 units on 22 July 2022.

A new mix by Tony Swain and Gary Kemp was released in 2002 on the compilation album Reformation. In April 2008, the single celebrated its 25th anniversary, and in honour of that occasion, EMI released a brand new True EP including the original single, the new mix found on Reformation, and the remastered album version, plus live recordings of "True" and "Gold" from the last show of the group's 1983 tour at Sadler's Wells.

Critical reception
When Betty Page reviewed the True album for Record Mirror, she wrote, "Kemp proves himself a softie beyond all doubt with final track 'True', a smoochy 'I am just a poor boy' epic, hand firmly on heart." Her colleague at the magazine, Daniela Soave, was less ambiguous in her review of the single, calling it a "genuine pearl of a song that deserves to be at number one" and summarizing, "Suffice to say 'True' makes you melt. Sentimental but not slushy, warm but not stifling, Spandau Ballet have hit the nail well and truly on the head and got it absolutely right."

A few of the retrospective reviews were complimentary. In 2009, Tim Rice wrote in The Spectator that the song was "a giant of its time and remains a standard today". In 2015, Peter Larsen wrote for The Orange County Register that the band's formula of mining "a vein of soulfulness tinged with nostalgia and romance" had "reached perfection" on the track, describing it as "the one Spandau Ballet song everyone knows ... It's truly a perfect song, as moving today as ever it was." Stewart Mason of AllMusic mixed in negative comments in an otherwise positive review:

There were, however, critics who showed complete disdain for the song, including a few different writers for The Guardian. In dismissing Spandau Ballet as "Thatcherism on vinyl", Michael Hann described "True" as "dreadful wine-bar soul". Ian Gittins reviewed the band's 2014 Royal Albert Hall concert and, in criticising the section of the setlist that focused on their later material in which they "ditch cult status and agenda-setting futurism in favour of slick, chart-friendly shoulder-heaving soul", called "True" a "juggernaut power ballad". Luke Williams referred to the song as "the biggest load of musical tosh ever" and answered Kemp's question about finding it hard to write the next line by saying, "It's because you're a crap songwriter, idiot." In The Rolling Stone Album Guide, Paul Evans complained that "Kemp, with 'Gold' and 'True', provided Hadley perfect songs for hamming it up: lush MOR that would've been clever if it had been intended ironically."

Music video and tour fashion
When Spandau Ballet were filmed for the "Lifeline" music video, Kemp acknowledged that the clothes they wore were "drab" and that the shift to pop left them "caught in a moment of not knowing what to wear". With an upcoming tour of Europe they felt they needed to update their style and met with an old friend from Soho, Chris Sullivan, for guidance since they felt out of touch with the latest trends. They wanted uniformity and decided on suits since no one else was wearing them at the time. Sullivan presented them with sketches of his ideas, and Kemp described the look they settled on and its lasting impact on their image: "He'd come up with the idea of the gambling gunslinger, a sort of Wyatt Earp meets City Boy; five Wild West-enders. And in good cowboy fashion, it was to brand us forever."

The band wore a variation of this look for the "True" video and had only their instruments with them on an otherwise bare soundstage. The original video incorporated a series of scenes filmed in black and white involving a young man who evolves from anguish as he roams city streets to jubilation as he is joined by animation renderings of the man and the dove from the album cover. Dominic Anciano did the animation, which the band did not like and decided not to use. When Kemp spoke to Creem magazine in 1984, he summarized the version that only showed the band, saying, "I didn't want to dictate what [the video] should be like. I'm sure when people hear that record they've got their own idea of what it means and what it looks like. So we just performed it and lit it well—shooting light through water and broken glass—and it worked." Although Kemp is not credited with playing piano on the song, he is shown doing so in the video, and brother Martin is shown playing guitar even though he had been replaced by Swain on the synth-bass for the studio recording. 

"True" was listed on MTV's reports to Billboard indicating what videos were in rotation on the cable network, making its first appearance there in the 9 July 1983 issue, which indicated that it had been added to their playlist as of 29 June.

Aftermath
"Gold", the next single released from the True album, entered the UK Singles Chart in August 1983 to begin a nine-week run, reaching number 2. But while it also made the top 10 on the pop charts in several countries its number 29 showing in the US was the first signal to Kemp that Chrysalis America was not promoting them. "Communication" only reached number 59 in the US in 1984, and "Only When You Leave", the first single from their next album, Parade, became their last Hot 100 entry when it peaked at number 34 later that year. Kemp was unhappy with their performances as well and blamed the low numbers on a perceived conflict between Chrysalis founders Chris Wright and Terry Ellis distracting them from promotional efforts. Wright refused to license the band to a bigger label in the US, so they sought legal advice to get out of their contract. The disappointing chart performance in the US led Spandau Ballet to leave Chrysalis for CBS Records, which released their Parade follow-up, Through the Barricades, in 1986.
Hadley felt that the band's inability to sustain the interest of the American public resulted from a few other factors working against them, primarily that their big US hit was very different to what they had already succeeded with elsewhere. Kemp had said in an interview before "Gold"'s US release that he hoped it would give Americans a more balanced view of Spandau Ballet. Although some American concert attendees knew their old songs, he hoped their upcoming US tour would show the rest who came that "True" was not the sort of song they normally did. 

In retrospect, however, Hadley felt they needed to spend several months touring the US so that more audiences could hear that back catalogue and not doing so also hurt their record sales there. They played "True" at the 1985 Live Aid concert, but instead of using their brief time on stage to showcase one of their earlier hits, Dagger wanted them to play "Virgin" from their upcoming Through the Barricades album, which even Kemp admitted was not a good idea. Hadley felt Dagger was inexperienced, but whenever he suggested getting a manager with more knowledge about the business, the rest of the band balked. 
	
Kemp told Creem in 1984 that he would continue to write for the larger audience Spandau Ballet had acquired with "True" but it would not be making albums that sounded like the last just because it did well. But, just as he had developed writer's block in 1981 after "Chant No. 1" became their highest-charting single, having a UK number 1 put pressure on Kemp to churn out more chart-topping hits and left him feeling that the band would always judge his future output against "True". When the Through the Barricades album and its singles failed to chart in the US, Kemp chided himself for exploring so many genres and not simply trying to write more hit songs that were imitations of "True".

Legacy
In 1984 writer-director John Hughes featured Spandau Ballet's recording of "True" in the school dance scene in Sixteen Candles, and his selection elicited responses decades later. In 2009 LA Weekly'''s Art Tavana noted that when it was used in that particular moment, the song "crossed over into the permanent teenage scrapbook". Also in 2009 Todd Martens of the Los Angeles Times described the emotion created by playing the song over the scene as "Totally crazy this-is-the-end-of-the-world heartache". Julian Kimble of the Washington City Paper wrote in 2014 that its inclusion "made Spandau Ballet's imprint on popular culture permanent" and that the song "adopted new significance, especially among suburban teens". 

The 2009 episode of Modern Family titled "Great Expectations" featured Edward Norton playing fictional Spandau Ballet bassist Izzy LaFontaine and beginning a performance of the song, which is then followed by part of the original recording.

"Set Adrift on Memory Bliss" by P.M. Dawn, a duo of brothers Jarrett and Attrell Cordes, prominently sampled "True" and went to number 1 on the Billboard Hot 100 in November 1991. They had heard "True" in the studio where they were working on their debut album, and Attrell, known on stage as Prince Be, thought it was "so beautiful". He said, "I wanted Prince Be's version. I basically reincarnated the spirit of 'True' for me. I reshaped it as if I wrote it myself." Kemp received a writing credit with Prince Be for "Set Adrift on Memory Bliss", and Hadley appeared briefly in the music video. The duo's hit also went to number 1 on New Zealand's pop chart and made the top 10 in several countries. Kemp also received songwriting credit when "True" was sampled on the 2007 hit "You" by Lloyd that featured Lil Wayne and peaked at number 9 on the Hot 100. The Professor of Rock surprised Hadley in the 2017 interview by pointing out that the Backstreet Boys' "I Want It That Way" lifts the piano section at the end of "True"'s sax solo for the melody line of its chorus.

In 2015, "True" was voted by the British public as the nation's 10th-favourite 1980s number 1 in an ITV poll; NPR characterised it as a "karaoke staple". Other surveys were not favourable: Billboard selected "True" as one of the "Most Overplayed Songs in Movies",  NME included the line "I bought a ticket to the world but now I've come back again" in their list of the "50 worst pop lyrics of all time", and it also made the Houston Presss list of "10 Songs We Never, Ever Want to Hear Again, Ever". Sean Daly of the St. Petersburg Times named "True" the worst song of all time, while Seattle Post-Intelligencer columnist Robert Jamieson selected it as the worst ever love song. 

Kemp did find one famous fan: "I remember when I did The Bodyguard, Kevin Costner said to me, 'You know, that song belongs to me and my wife.' And I thought, wow, I thought it belonged to my plumber and his wife…  Anyway, it didn't keep [the Costners] together, did it?"

Cover versions
Will.i.am and Fergie of the American pop-rap act Black Eyed Peas covered "True" for the 2004 Adam Sandler–Drew Barrymore film 50 First Dates. Matthew Sheby of Soundtrack.net liked their hip-hop version, and Spence D of IGN thought it was a "pretty true rendition". American indie rock singer-songwriter Cary Brothers recorded it for the 2005 superhero comedy film Sky High and received differing opinions. Soundtrack.Net's Brian McVickar thought it was "certainly a winner among this [soundtrack] collection", while Heather Phares of AllMusic only found it "blandly pleasant".

Canadian-born American singer Paul Anka released a version of the song in 2005 on his album Rock Swings, with most critics noting that his cover was one of the better songs included. Michael Fremer of Analog Planet speculated that the arrangement was inspired by "Li'l Darlin'" and felt that it "gives the melancholic song a sophisticated lilt, over which Anka sells the lyrics with a powerful, assertive reading. If you didn't know the original, you'd think the tune was originally written for big band treatment." Jazz Timess Christopher Loudon wrote, "When Rock Swings is good, it’s very good – most notably on introspective ballads like Spandau Ballet’s 'True'." John Kappes of The Plain Dealer explained, "Some of the material works as well as you might think; Spandau Ballet's 'True' was, after all, an easy-listening track waiting to happen from the start." The Village Voices Franklin Bruno, however, felt that the album's "several attempts to negotiate impressionistic lyrics (Spandau Ballet's 'True,' Billy Idol's 'Eyes Without a Face') as though they possessed narrative content are comically misguided." Upon confessing that he had heard the Anka version, Hadley chuckled, "It was a bit strange," and admitted to performing the song with a swing orchestra. He could only concede, "It kind of works. It's very unusual. I think when people wanna hear me sing it, they wanna hear me sing the straight version."

Formats and track listingsUK 7-inch single "True" – 5:40
 "Lifeline (Edited Remix for USA)" – 3:34US 7-inch single "True" – 5:40
 "Gently" – 4:0112-inch single "True" – 6:30
 "Lifeline (Remix for USA)" – 5:15
 "Lifeline (A Capella)" – 2:011991 CD single "True (Edit)" – 5:36
 "Lifeline (Edited Remix)" – 3:39
 "Heaven is a Secret" – 4:24
 "Pleasure" – 3:30

Personnel
Credits adapted from the liner notes for True:Spandau Ballet Tony Hadley – lead vocals
 Gary Kemp – guitar and backing vocals
 Martin Kemp – bass
 Steve Norman – saxophone and percussion
 John Keeble – drumsAdditional musician Jess Bailey – keyboardsProduction'''
 Tony Swain – producer, engineer
 Steve Jolley – producer
 Spandau Ballet – producers
 Richard Lengyel – engineering assistance
 Tim Young – mastering
 David Band – art direction, illustration
 Stephen Horsfall – typography
 Mixed at Red Bus Studios (London)
 Mastered at CBS Studios (London)

Charts

Weekly charts

Year-end charts

Certifications

See also
List of number-one singles of 1983 (Canada)
List of UK Singles Chart number ones of the 1980s
 List of Billboard Adult Contemporary number ones of 1983

Notes

References

Bibliography

External links
 
 

1982 songs
1983 singles
1980s ballads
Spandau Ballet songs
Irish Singles Chart number-one singles
RPM Top Singles number-one singles
UK Singles Chart number-one singles
Music videos directed by Russell Mulcahy
Song recordings produced by Jolley & Swain
Songs written by Gary Kemp
Songs about Marvin Gaye
Chrysalis Records singles
New wave ballads
Soul ballads